Michael George Hoey (born 13 February 1979) is a retired Northern Irish professional golfer who played on the European Tour and the Challenge Tour.

Amateur career
Hoey was born in Ballymoney but played much of his early golf at Shandon Park Golf Club in East Belfast. He won the British Amateur Championship in 2001 and was a member of the victorious 2001 Great Britain & Ireland Walker Cup team. As British Amateur Champion, he was invited to play in the Masters Tournament in 2002, where he missed the cut by a single stroke. He turned professional later that year. He played his collegiate golf at Clemson University.

Professional career
Until 2009, Hoey had struggled to secure his place on the main European Tour and had mostly competed in the second tier Challenge Tour where he has three tournament victories, the 2005 BA-CA Golf Open, the 2007 Tessali-Metaponto Open di Puglia e Basilicata, and the 2008 Banque Populaire Moroccan Classic. He finished 8th on the end of season rankings in 2005, which gave him automatic promotion to the European Tour. Following a largely unsuccessful début season in 2006, he returned to the Challenge Tour the following year. He regained his playing privileges on the European Tour for the 2009 season at final qualifying school.

Early in 2009, Hoey finished runner-up to Retief Goosen in the Africa Open on the Sunshine Tour. Then in April, he claimed his first European Tour title, at the Estoril Open de Portugal where he defeated Gonzalo Fernández-Castaño on the third hole of a sudden death playoff. The win also gave him a one-year exemption on the European Tour. He won twice in 2011, including his most prestigious title to date at the Alfred Dunhill Links Championship. He picked up his fourth victory on the European Tour in 2012 at the Trophée Hassan II.

In July 2013, Hoey won his fifth European Tour title at the M2M Russian Open, prevailing by four strokes from Alexandre Kaleka and Matthew Nixon. His victory was set up by a third round score of 65, which took him into the lead heading into the final round.

Hoey represented Ireland, alongside Gareth Maybin at the 2007 Omega Mission Hills World Cup where they finished in 24th position.

In February 2022, Hoey announced his retirement from professional golf, becoming a referee on the European Tour.

Amateur wins
1998 Irish Amateur Open Championship
2001 Amateur Championship

Professional wins (8)

European Tour wins (5)

1Dual-ranking event with the Challenge Tour

European Tour playoff record (1–0)

Challenge Tour wins (4)

1Dual-ranking event with the European Tour

Challenge Tour playoff record (1–1)

Results in major championships

CUT = missed the half-way cut
DQ = disqualified
WD = withdrew
"T" = tied

Results in World Golf Championships

"T" = Tied

Team appearances
Amateur
European Youths' Team Championship (representing Ireland): 1998, 2000
European Amateur Team Championship (representing Ireland): 1999, 2001
Palmer Cup (representing Great Britain & Ireland): 1999
Walker Cup (representing Great Britain & Ireland): 2001 (winners)

Professional
World Cup (representing Ireland): 2007
European Championships (representing Ireland): 2018

See also
2005 Challenge Tour graduates
2008 European Tour Qualifying School graduates
List of golfers with most Challenge Tour wins

References

External links

Male golfers from Northern Ireland
Clemson Tigers men's golfers
European Tour golfers
People from Ballymoney
Sportspeople from Belfast
Sportspeople from County Antrim
1979 births
Living people